Remphan was the subject of idolatrous worship mentioned by Stephen at the time of his death in the New Testament Book of Acts . It is presumed by Biblical scholars to be the same as Kiyyun or Chiun, mentioned in Amos . Since the words "Kiyyun" ("Chiun") and "Remphan" are each hapax legomenon, there is debate whether they are meant as common or proper nouns, and their exact meaning.

In the Bible 
In the New Testament, Stephen condemns 'Jewish idolatry' in the following verse: "Ye took up the tabernacle of Moloch, and the star of your god Remphan, figures which ye made to worship them: and I will carry you away beyond Babylon." It is seen as a reference to Amos 5:26–27: "Ye have borne the tabernacle of your Moloch and Chiun your images, the star of your god, which ye made to yourselves. (27) Therefore will I cause you to go into captivity beyond Damascus, saith the LORD, whose name is The God of Hosts."

The context for the admonition is that Amos had been sent to the northern Kingdom of Samaria, where Judaism had become syncretic with foreign idolatry, which he declares unacceptable. It is seen as a prophetic reference to Shalmaneser V's later capture of the Israelites and taking them into the cities of the Medes.

Etymology 
Remphan is a rendering of the Ancient Greek, . Various manuscripts offer other transliterations of this pronunciation, including . It is likely in reference to "Kiyyun" ("Chiun") mentioned in Amos , which the Septuagint renders as "Raiphan" (Ῥαιφάν) or "Rephan". Kiyyun is generally assumed to be the god Saturn, the Assyriaan name of which was "Kayvân" ("Kēwān").

Christian analysis 
In  Moses and Aaron (1625), Thomas Godwyn claimed Kiyyun and the Star of Remphan should be held as separate entities, the first a reference to the deity Heracles, and the latter a reference to a painted mark on the forehead of Molech.

In the 18th century, Christian Gottlieb Wolff referenced the belief that the name actually came from Ancient Egypt, by way of the Aminonitarum, tying his worship into the period that Diodorus Siculus' history references the king "Remphis", possibly Ramses III, beginning a seven-generation decline of Egyptian civilization.

The August 1862 edition of The Quiver noted "'The star of your god Remphan' is an expression which cases some difficulty. The star is probably the representation of the star Remphan, which Stephen with cutting reproach calls 'your god'. But who or what was Remphan? [...] The fact is, we know but little respecting the false gods worshipped in Syria and Palestine at different times, although the names of many of them have come down to us".

See also 
Ancient Mesopotamian religion
List of Mesopotamian deities
Kayvan
Kajamanu

References

Notes 

Deities in the Hebrew Bible
Saturnian deities